The name Edmé may refer to:

Edmé Bouchardon (1698–1762), French sculptor
Edmé Boursault (1638–1701), French writer and dramatist
Edme Castaing (1796–1823), French physician
Edmé-Louis Daubenton (1732–1786), French naturalist
Gaston Audiffret-Pasquier (1823–1905), born Edme-Armand-Gaston d'Audiffret-Pasquier, French politician
Edme Étienne Borne Desfourneaux (1767–1849), French general
Edme Gaulle (1762–1841), French sculptor
Edme Henry (1760–1841), Canadian politician
Edme François Jomard (1777–1862), French engineer and cartographer
Edme-Jean Leclaire (1801–1872), French economist
Edme Mariotte (1620–1684), French physicist
Edme Mongin (1668–1746), French bishop and orator
Edmé Samson (1810–1891), French ceramist
Edmé-Martin Vandermaesen (1767–1813), French general in the Napoleonic Wars
Edmé Félix Alfred Vulpian (1826–1887), French physician

People named Edmée
Edmée Daenen (born 1985), Belgian singer
Edmee Janss (born 1965), Dutch cricketer
Edmée Pardo (born 1965), Mexican writer